The Extended Duration Orbiter (EDO) program was a project by NASA to prepare for long-term (months) microgravity research aboard Space Station Freedom, which later evolved into the International Space Station. Scientists and NASA needed practical experience in managing progressively longer times for their experiments. The original Space Shuttle configuration usually provided a week to ten days of spaceflight. Several research projects and hardware components were part of the project, of which the EDO-pallet was one of the most visible, contracted by Rockwell International.

The first orbiter outfitted with the EDO hardware configuration was Endeavour, during its construction, and its last EDO flight was STS-67, in 1995. Endeavour's EDO modifications were removed in 1996 as part of routine maintenance, to reduce the orbiter's weight prior to STS-89. Columbia was outfitted for EDO flight during its maintenance period from August 10, 1991, through February 9, 1992, prior to STS-50, which was the first EDO flight. From 1992, through 1994, Atlantis went through a maintenance period, during which Atlantis was modified to have the provisions needed for EDO capability, but NASA chose not to proceed with the final modifications, and Atlantis never had EDO capability. The EDO-pallet used in these orbiter configurations was destroyed in the 2003 Columbia disaster.

EDO Pallet

The Extended Duration Orbiter Cryogenic kit (EDO-pallet or CRYO) was a  equipment assembly which attached vertically to the payload bay rear bulkhead of an orbiter, and allowed the orbiter to support a flight of up to 16 days duration. The equipment included cryogenic tanks, associated control panels, and avionics equipment. Although Atlantis was partially upgraded to accommodate the EDO, only Columbia and Endeavour actually flew with the pallet. The pallet made its debut on STS-50, and was lost on STS-107 in 2003.

Initially, NASA considered adding a second EDO pallet to Endeavour, placed in front of the first, for a total of thirteen tank sets, that would have allowed an orbiter to remain in space for 28 days, but managers decided against it when the International Space Station assembly began, and instead removed the EDO capability from the orbiter, to reduce its weight and allow it to carry more cargo to the ISS.

No replacement for the pallet was planned, since the Station-to-Shuttle Power Transfer System provided much of the same abilities, and the 2011 retirement of the shuttle fleet made it redundant.

Specifications 
When filled with cryogens, the system weight was approximately 7,000 pounds (3.2 t).

Use 
Oxygen and hydrogen were supplied to the orbiter's three electrical power generating fuel cells, where they were converted into sufficient electrical energy to support the average 4 family-member house for approximately 6 months.  About 3,000 pounds of pure drinking water was also produced by the fuel cells.

Missions with the EDO pallet conducted research on microgravity, Life Sciences, Earth and celestial observations, and human adaptation to the low gravity environment.

The following missions used the EDO pallet:

{| class="wikitable"
! EDO Flight
! Shuttle
! Mission
! Launch Date
! Duration
! Primary Payload(s)
|-
|1
|Columbia
|STS-50
|June 25, 1992
|13 days, 19 hours, 30 minutes, 4 seconds
|United States Microgravity Laboratory-1
|-
|2
|Columbia
|STS-58
|October 18, 1993
|14 days, 0 hours, 12 minutes, 32 seconds
|Spacelab Life Sciences-2
|-
|3
|Columbia
|STS-62
|March 4, 1994
|13 days, 23 hours, 16 minutes, 41 seconds
|United States Microgravity Payload-2
|-
|4
|Columbia
|STS-65
|July 8, 1994
|14 days, 17 hours, 55 minutes, 1 second
|International Microgravity Laboratory-2
|-
|5
|Endeavour
|STS-67
|March 2, 1995
|16 days, 15 hours, 8 minutes, 48 seconds
|ASTRO-2
|-
|6
|Columbia
|STS-73
|October 20, 1995
|15 days, 21 hours, 53 minutes, 16 seconds
|United States Microgravity Laboratory-2
|-
|7
|Columbia
|STS-75
|February 22, 1996
|15 days, 17 hours, 40 minutes, 22 seconds
|Tethered Satellite System-1R (reflight of Tethered Satellite System-1 on STS-46)United States Microgravity Payload-3
|-
|8
|Columbia
|STS-78
|June 20, 1996
|16 days, 21 hours, 48 minutes, 30 seconds
|Life and Microgravity Spacelab
|-
|9
|Columbia
|STS-80
|November 19, 1996
|17 days, 15 hours, 53 minutes, 18 seconds
|Wake Shield FacilityORFEUS-SPAS II
|-
|10
|Columbia
|STS-83
|April 4, 1997
|3 days, 23 hours, 13 minutes, 38 seconds
|Microgravity Science Laboratory-1 (Mission ended early due to a problem with one of Columbia'''s fuel cells.)
|-
|11
|Columbia|STS-94
|July 1, 1997
|15 days, 16 hours, 45 minutes, 29 seconds
|Microgravity Science Laboratory-1 (reflight of STS-83)
|-
|12
|Columbia|STS-87
|November 19, 1997
|15 days, 16 hours, 35 minutes, 1 second
|United States Microgravity Payload-4SPARTAN-201
|-
|13
|Columbia|STS-90
|April 17, 1998
|15 days, 21 hours, 50 minutes, 58 seconds
|Neurolab
|-
|14
|Columbia|STS-107
|January 16, 2003
|15 days, 22 hours, 20 minutes, 32 seconds
|SPACEHAB Research Double ModuleFREESTAR, Lost during reentry, Space Shuttle Columbia disaster
|-
|}

EDO medical project

Prior to the EDO project, no shuttle had flown a mission longer than 10 days. Since space travelers may faint when they stand up (orthostatic intolerance) after returning to normal gravity even after short flights, and muscle strength may be reduced, the EDOMP project focused on ensuring that the crew could land the orbiter, and exit from it without help after a 16-day flight. Astronauts on 40 shuttle flights (STS-32 through STS-72) participated in 36 EDOMP investigations. The results of these investigations were used to make rules and recommendations for 16-day flights. Several types of exercise devices (i.e. a treadmill, a cycle ergometer, and a rower) were among the devices and procedures developed to prevent the de-conditioning of the body that occurs during space flight. The crew transport vehicles, in which astronauts were transported after landing, were built to enhance medical capabilities at the landing site, as well as crew comfort and safety. A database of 125 formal publications, and 299 abstracts, technical papers, and presentations, also resulted from the EDOMP. The project saw its successor in the ISS Medical Project.

Other EDO projects and studies
 Manual Apparel Cleaning System - A system for laundering selected items of clothing.
 An automated Fault Detection, Isolation, and Reconfiguration-system  (FDIR) that would support the shuttles for up to 28 days.
 Extended Duration Orbiter Waste Collection System. A similar system was later added to ISS as the ISS Waste Collector Subsystem.
 Extended Duration Orbiter Regenerable CO2 Removal System.
 Medical Extended Medical Enterprise (MEME)''.

See also
 List of Space Shuttle missions

References

External links
 

Space Shuttle program
Spacecraft components